Nestlé Pakistan is a Pakistani food company which is a subsidiary of Swiss multinational company Nestlé. It is active in dairy, confectionery, coffee, beverages, infant nutrition and bottled drinking water areas. It is based in Lahore, Pakistan.

History
The company was founded in 1988 by Nestlé in a joint venture with Milkpak. Then in 1992, Nestlé acquired Milkpak brand from its former owner Packages Limited.

The company allegedly repeated controversial infant formula marketing practices in Pakistan during the 1990s. This first emerged in developing countries during the 1977 Nestlé boycott. A Pakistani salesman named Syed Aamir Raza Hussain became a whistle-blower against Nestlé. In 1999, two years after he left Nestlé, Hussain released a report in association with the non-profit organisation, International Baby Food Action Network, in which he alleged that Nestlé was encouraging doctors to push its infant formula products over breastfeeding. Nestlé has denied Raza's allegations. This story inspired the 2014 acclaimed Indian film Tigers by the Oscar winning Bosnian director Danis Tanović.

Products
 Milk, milk-based products and cereals
Beverages, juices and bottled drinking water
Baby food, coffee and confectionery

Safe for consumption milk
Pakistan Council of Scientific and Industrial Research (PCSIR) conducted tests on 16 brands of packaged milk and found that only six brands were safe for consumption. It was stated by the PCSIR representative in the National Assembly of Pakistan in January 2017. All the tested milk brands had been given Ultra High Temperature (UHT) and pasteurisation treatment before the PCSIR testing.

Safe for consumption milk brands were Olper's, Nestle, Milk Pak, Day Fresh, Good Milk, Nurpur Original. 10 brands of pasteurised milk were also tested, and only Prema Milk was found safe for consumption in 2017.

Plants
The company operates two multi-purpose processing plants in the following cities:
 Sheikhupura
 Kabirwala

The company also operates two water factories in the following cities:
 Islamabad
 Karachi

Nestle Pakistan Limited is traded on the Pakistan Stock Exchange.

References

Nestlé
Dairy products companies of Pakistan
Manufacturing companies based in Lahore
Companies listed on the Pakistan Stock Exchange
Pakistani subsidiaries of foreign companies
Food and drink companies established in 1988
Pakistani companies established in 1988
1992 mergers and acquisitions
Mergers and acquisitions of Pakistani companies